Joon Park (Korean name: Park Joon-hyung, ; born July 20, 1969) is a South Korean-born American singer, actor and entertainer based in South Korea. As a singer, he is best known as the leader and rapper of the Korean pop group g.o.d.

Early life
Park was born in South Korea, the youngest of three siblings, and raised in the United States, later becoming an American citizen. His father died when he was young, leaving him and his older siblings to be raised by their single mother. He graduated from La Quinta High School in Westminster, California and attended California State University, Long Beach. Prior to entering the entertainment industry, he worked at an advertising firm as a graphic designer.

Career

Early years and forming g.o.d
In 1997 Park moved to Seoul, South Korea, where his older sister had been working, with the dream of creating a pop music group. He wanted to mix Korean music with a twist of western culture. The first member he recruited was his cousin Danny Ahn, followed by Danny's friend Son Ho-young, aspiring singer Yoon Kye-sang and rookie actress Kim Sun-a. However, their agency was forced to cut funding for trainees due to the 1997 Asian financial crisis and only relented due to Park and the other members' persistence. Singer-songwriter Park Jin-young was introduced to be their producer and the group was initially a six-piece mixed-gender group tentatively named "GOT6".

In the midst of preparations for the group's debut and album, Park was cast in a beer commercial for Oriental Brewery and also landed a small recurring role in the SBS sitcom Soonpoong Clinic (ko) as the boyfriend of Song Hye-kyo's character. Park later stated that all his earnings from the commercial and sitcom was spent on daily living expenses during the period he and the other members did not receive financial funding from their agency for over a year.

Kim Sun-a left to pursue acting. The final member, high school student Kim Tae-woo, joined the group in July 1998 after sending in an audition tape and impressing Park Jin-young during their meeting. The now five-member band then became g.o.d, short for Groove Over Dose.

1999–2005: g.o.d

g.o.d debuted on television in January 1999 but their performance of "To Mother" (어머님께) was met with a lukewarm response from critics as the song's subject matter was highly unusual for that of an idol group, whom were usually pitched as teen idols. Nevertheless, the song would go on to be one of g.o.d's most famous hits. It was partly based on Joon's childhood being raised by a widowed single mother. The group also gained attention due to the large age gap between Park and Kim (12 years) and Park being much older than most of their contemporaries, who were either in their late teens or early twenties.

The group nearly broke up in 2001 after Park was discovered to be dating, which was considered to be taboo for most pop stars in South Korea at that time. Their management announced, without informing Park or the other group members, that Park was to leave the group and g.o.d would continue as a quartet. It was met with strong objection from fans, who signed petitions against the decision and threatened to boycott concerts. Ahn, Yoon, Son and Kim held their own press conference to show their support for Park and their management eventually backed down.

2006–2014: Hiatus and acting

With Yoon having left the group in 2004, they decided to take a break in 2006 as the lead vocalist of the group Kim Tae-woo was required to perform his compulsory military duty. The other four members began their solo careers in the entertainment industry while Park returned to the United States. He moved back to the Los Angeles area to pursue acting, having a cameo on Speed Racer as the Platinum blond-haired Yakuza Driver and the role of Yamcha in the live-action film version of Dragonball Evolution in which he starred with Chow Yun Fat, Justin Chatwin, Emmy Rossum and Jamie Chung. He injured his back while filming Dragonball Evolution and was forced to rehabilitate for over two years.

2014–present: Return to Korea
Park returned to Korea as the members of g.o.d had agreed to reunite for their 15th anniversary in 2014. He re-signed with SidusHQ, which also manages g.o.d. Since g.o.d's reunion, he has been utilizing his graphic design background in contributing to the production of their concerts, providing artwork for background visual effects and designing concert posters.

Park made a cameo as himself on MBC drama You Are My Destiny, which starred his long-time friend Jang Hyuk. In their scene, Jang's character enters rapping the opening verse of g.o.d's debut song "To Mother" in an exaggerated manner, a tongue-in-cheek reference to him starring in the song's music video. He and fellow K-pop stars Sunny from Girls' Generation and Jackson Wang from Got7 joined the cast for the second season of Roommate, a reality television series in which various celebrities share a house and are responsible for all household chores and meals. The show was not renewed for a third season due to low ratings despite the new additions being well-received.

Since returning to Korea, Park has largely been cast in various variety and reality shows such as Infinite Challenge, Saturday Night Live Korea, Radio Star, Life Bar and others, having gained popularity with audiences due to his cheerful persona and candidness. He also appeared in the music videos for "Shake That Brass", the title track of singer-rapper Amber Liu's debut EP Beautiful, and "Hot Sugar" (뜨거운 설탕), the comeback single of Kim Jong-kook's group Turbo.

In July 2018, Park opened a YouTube channel called Wassup Man featuring himself video blogging his travels in Korea. The videos began going viral on social media in South Korea and the channel had nearly 900,000 subscribers within two months. Based on data compiled by YouTube of the most viewed and popular videos in South Korea, Wassup Man drew the most South Korea-based subscribers within the shortest period of time during 2018.

In 2020, Wassup Man was adapted as a Netflix series titled Wassup Man GO featuring Park in Los Angeles.

Personal life
On May 4, 2015, Park's agency announced that he was engaged to Kim Yoo-Jin, a flight attendant whom he had been dating for about a year. They married on June 26, 2015. Their daughter was born on May 10, 2017.

Filmography

Films

Drama

Variety shows

Discography

As a featured artist

References

External links

 Profile on SidusHQ
 
 
  Wassup Man

1969 births
Living people
G.o.d (South Korean band) members
American emigrants to South Korea
American male dancers
American male rappers
American musicians of Korean descent
American people of South Korean descent
American rappers of Asian descent
California State University, Long Beach alumni
IHQ (company) artists
JYP Entertainment artists
People from Westminster, California
South Korean male idols
21st-century American rappers